A predator is an animal that kills other animals to eat.

Predator or The Predator may also refer to:

Entertainment and media

Films and spin-offs
 Predator (franchise)
 Predator (film), 1987 film that established the franchise
 Predator 2, 1990 film
 Predators (film), 2010 film
 The Predator (film), 2018 film
 Predator (fictional species), the extraterrestrial species featured in the film
 List of Predator comics
 Predator (novel series)
 Predator (video game), 1987
 Predators (video game), 2010

Literature
 Predator (Cornwell novel), by Patricia Cornwell
 Predator (Smith novel), by Wilbur Smith
 The Predator (novel), a book in the Animorphs series
 Predator, the first novel in the Isaac Asimov's Robots in Time series

Music
 Predator (album), by Accept
 The Predator (Ice Cube album), and its title track
 The Predator (EP), by Ice Nine Kills
 The Predators (Japanese band)
 The Predators (Australian band)

Television
 Predator, a television ident for BBC Two, first aired in 2000; see BBC Two '1991–2001' idents
 "The Predators" (Have Gun – Will Travel), a 1962 episode

Military
 Predator SRAW, a missile system
 MQ-1 Predator, an unmanned aerial vehicle (drone) in use since 1995
 RQ-9 Predator B, an unmanned aerial vehicle (drone) in use since 2001 and now known as the MQ-9 Reaper
 Predator C, an unmanned aerial vehicle (drone) now known as the General Atomics Avenger

People
 Patrick Côté (fighter) (born 1980), Canadian mixed martial artist, nicknamed "The Predator"
 Don Frye (born 1965), American mixed martial artist, nicknamed "The Predator"
 Michael Gomez (born 1977), professional boxer, nicknamed "The Predator"
 Horace Hogan (born 1965), American professional wrestler with the ring name "The Predator"
 Sylvester Terkay (born 1970), American professional wrestler with the ring name "The Predator"
 Chase Young (born 1999), American football player, nicknamed "The Predator"
Francis Ngannou (born 1986), French-Cameroonian mixed martial artist and current UFC Heavyweight Champion, nicknamed "The Predator."

Sports
 Adidas Predator, a range of football boots
 Nashville Predators, a United States hockey team
 Orlando Predators, a United States arena football team
 Laval Predators, a Canadian hockey team in the Ligue Nord-Américaine de Hockey

Other uses
 Predator (truck), a monster truck and the team to which it belongs
 Predator (roller coaster)
 Sexual predator 
 Predator, an agricultural-aircraft design by Burt Rutan
 Acer Predator, a gaming computer brand
 Predator, brand of high-end Pool (cue sports) cues

See also
 Predator X (disambiguation)
 Apex Predator (disambiguation)
 Superpredators (disambiguation)
 Alien vs. Predator (disambiguation)
 Alien (disambiguation)